Mikhail Trifonovich Iovchuk (19 November 1908 — 9 January 1990) was a Soviet philosopher, Communist Party official and Corresponding Member of the Academy of Sciences of the Soviet Union.

Biography 
Born in to a peasant family, Iovchuk joined the Communist Party in 1926.

He graduated from the Philosophy Department of the Krupskaya Academy of Communist Education in 1931. Until 1933, he also studied at the Institute of Red Professors. From 1933 to 1936 he was the head of the political department of a state farm in the Byelorussian SSR. From 1936 to 1939 he headed the departments of dialectical materialism and Marxism-Leninism at the Moscow Institute of Chemical Technology and the Moscow Timiryazev Agricultural Academy.

From September to November 1939 he was deputy head of the press and propaganda department of the Executive Committee of the Comintern. From November 1939 to September 1941 he was head of the propaganda department of the Executive Committee of the Comintern.

From 1941 to 1944 he worked in the Propaganda and Agitation Department of the Central Committee of the CPSU (B.). From May to June 1944 he was the editor-in-chief of the magazine Under the Banner of Marxism. From May 1944 to February 1947 he was deputy head of the Propaganda and Agitation Department of the Central Committee of the CPSU (B). Simultaneously from 1943 to 1947 he headed the Department of History of Russian Philosophy at the Faculty of Philosophy of Moscow State University.

From March 7, 1947 to February 15, 1949 Iovchuk served as Secretary of the Central Committee of the Communist Party of Belarus (b) for propaganda and agitation. At the same time he headed the Department of Philosophy at the Belarusian State University.

From 1949 to 1953 he was head of the Department of Dialectical and Historical Materialism at the Ural State University in Sverdlovsk. Since 1953 he has been a professor at the Department of History of Marxist-Leninist Philosophy, Faculty of Philosophy of the Moscow State University. From 1957 to 1963 he was head of the Department of the History of Marxist-Leninist Philosophy at the Faculty of Philosophy of the Moscow State University.

From 1957 to 1970 he was head of the sector History of Marxism-Leninism the Institute of Philosophy of the USSR Academy of Sciences and editor-in-chief of the journal Philosophical Sciences. From 1966 he was Chairman of the Scientific Council of the USSR Academy of Sciences on the History of Public Opinion.

From October 1970 to March 1978 he was rector of the Academy of Social Sciences under the Central Committee of the CPSU. From March 1978 he was a consultant to the Institute of Marxism-Leninism under the Central Committee of the CPSU.

Iovchuk died on January 9, 1990. He was buried in Moscow at the Vvedenskoye Cemetery.

Awards 

 Order of Lenin 
 Order of the October Revolution 
 2 Orders of the Red Banner of Labor 
 Order of Friendship of Peoples 
 Order of the Red Star 
 Order of the Badge of Honor

References 

1908 births
1990 deaths
20th-century Russian philosophers
Academic staff of Belarusian State University
Communist Party of the Soviet Union members
Corresponding Members of the USSR Academy of Sciences
Academic staff of the D. Mendeleev University of Chemical Technology of Russia
Foreign Members of the Bulgarian Academy of Sciences
Second convocation members of the Supreme Soviet of the Soviet Union
Recipients of the Order of Friendship of Peoples
Recipients of the Order of Lenin
Recipients of the Order of the Red Banner of Labour
Recipients of the Order of the Red Star
Historians of philosophy
Belarusian philosophers
Russian Marxists
Soviet philosophers
Burials at Vvedenskoye Cemetery